Changes is the second studio album from American R&B artist Christopher Williams, released on December 29, 1992 on Uptown Records.

The album peaked at sixty-three on the U.S. Billboard 200 and reached the twelfth spot on the R&B Albums chart.

Riding the waves of his #1 single, "I'm Dreamin', he would see another Top 10 single "Every Little Thing U Do" and a Top 20 R&B hit, "All I See".

Track listing

(**): Track available on CD only

Chart history

Album

Singles

"—" denotes releases that did not chart.

Personnel
Information taken from Allmusic.
arranging – DeVante Swing, Kenny "G-Love" Greene, Andre Wilson
assistant engineering – Charlie Allen, Gordon Davies, Kevin Davis, Jason DeCosta, Ben Garrison, Rich July, David Kingsley, Stephen McLaughlin, Chrystin Nevarez, Chris Olivas, Ken Quartarone, Thom Russo
assistant production – Andrew Cousins, Darryl Pearson, Darin Whittington, Christopher Williams, Andre Wilson, Brian Wilson
composing – DeVante Swing, Kenny "G-Love" Greene
creative director – Brett Wright
drum machine – Ike Lee III, Mark Morales
drums – Mark Morales
engineering – Paul Arnold, Eric "Ibo" Butler, Ross Donaldson, Mike Fonda, Ben Garrison, David Kennedy, Tony Maserati, Angela Piva, Tony Smalios, Dave Way, Mark Wilson, Gary Wright
executive production – Andre Harrell, Christopher Williams
guitar – Henry Grate
keyboards – Kevin Davis, Kevin Deane, Kiyamma Griffin, Avon Marshall, Mark C. Rooney
make-up – Melvone Farrell
mastering – Steve Hall, Dennis King, Jose Rodriguez
mixing – Angela Piva,Charles "Prince Charles" Alexander, Stanley Brown, Sean "Puffy" Combs, David Dachinger, David Kennedy, Tony Maserati, Angela Piva, Dave Way
mixing assistants – Hal Belknap, Jason DeCosta, Carl Glanville, Rich July, Dana Vicek
performer – Mary J. Blige
production – Stanley Brown, Sean "Puffy" Combs, Greg Cuathen, Kevin Davis, DeVante Swing, Kiyamma Griffin, Kenny "K-Smoove" Kornegay, Ike Lee III, Mark Morales, Anthony Ransom, Mark C. Rooney, Three Boys from Newark, Christopher Williams, Andre Wilson, Brian Wilson
production coordination – Crystal Johnson
vocal arrangement – DeVante Swing, Kenny "G-Love" Greene, Christopher Williams, Andre Wilson
vocals – Mary J. Blige
vocals (background) – Horace Brown, Kiyamma Griffin, Crystal Johnson, Omega Lowther, Brian Palmer, Mark C. Rooney, Christopher Williams, Andre Wilson

Notes

External links
 
 Changes at Discogs

1992 albums
MCA Records albums
Uptown Records albums
Christopher Williams (singer) albums
Albums produced by Cory Rooney